The 1861 Grey and Bell by-election was a by-election held on 20 June during the 3rd New Zealand Parliament in the Taranaki electorate of .

The by-election was caused by the death of the incumbent MP William Cutfield King on 8 February 1861.

The by-election was won by Harry Atkinson.

Atkinson was unopposed, and was duly declared elected.

Notes

Grey and Bell 1862
1862 elections in New Zealand
Politics of Taranaki